Mo Xuanqing (August 17, 834) was a was a Chinese novelist and poet. He was born in Zhaoqing, modern Guangdong, and was the youngest Zhuangyuan in the imperial examinations during the Tang Dynasty, in Chinese history. He became known for his literary talent from the age of 12. In 851, at the age of 17, he was also the first youngest Zhuangyuan in the imperial examination in Chinese history since the Sui Dynasty and the first Zhuangyuan in Lingnan.

Poetry
Mo Xuanqing composed more than 200 pieces: poems and songs, however, most of his poems were lost and there are not more than 20 pieces remaining published in China's literary history such as the Quan Tang Shi and the Cantonese Poetry Collection.

External links

QQ.com-十七歲被欽點狀元中國史上最年輕狀元莫宣卿
People.com.cn-肇慶曆史勝跡――唐狀元莫宣卿墓
Shuku.Mofcom-Mok SuenHing poetry
gaokao.com-海內外3萬人祭拜中國歷史上最年輕狀元

834 births
Year of death unknown
Date of death unknown
9th-century Chinese poets
Chinese male novelists
Poets from Guangdong
Tang dynasty novelists
Tang dynasty poets
Writers from Zhaoqing